Death of a Prophet is a 1981 television film, written and directed by Woodie King Jr., and starring Morgan Freeman as Malcolm X.

Cast
 Morgan Freeman as Malcolm X
 Yolanda King as Betty Shabazz
 Ossie Davis as himself
 Yuri Kochiyama as herself
 Amiri Baraka as himself

Reception
The Pittsburgh Post-Gazette said that the film "will stimulate discussion, but it won't shed any light on the [assassination] itself... To say Death of a Prophet takes liberties with the facts is an understatement, but the degree to which it does can be a bit irritating at times... Still, the film manages to capture an essential truth — Malcolm X was perceived in some circles and our government as a dangerous man because of his eloquence, self-discipline and unswerving dedication to black liberation."

Leonard Maltin's Movie Guide called the film a "low-budget but involving drama (with some documentary scenes) about the last day in the life of a black American leader. He's clearly supposed to be Malcolm X, though that name is not mentioned. Freeman is excellent, and the film's documentary style is effective."

References

External links

1981 drama films
1981 films
Films about Malcolm X
Films set in the 1960s
American drama television films
1980s English-language films
1980s American films